{{DISPLAYTITLE:C22H30O6}}
The molecular formula C22H30O6 (molar mass: 390.47 g/mol, exact mass: 390.2042 u) may refer to:

 Megaphone (molecule)
 Pregomisin
 Prostratin

Molecular formulas